Amnat Charoen is one of Thailand's seventy-six provinces (changwat) and lies central northeastern Thailand, also called Isan. Neighbouring provinces are (clockwise from the south) Ubon Ratchathani, Yasothon, and Mukdahan. To the east it borders Salavan of  Laos. Its name is a concatenation of อำนาจ ("authority, power") and เจริญ ("prosperous").

Geography
The province is in the Mekong valley. In dry season, from February to May, water in Mekong River declines, and allows islands to appear. Islands include Kaeng Tanglang at Si Sombun Village, close to Amphoe Chanuman, and Kaeng Hin Khan at Ban Hin Khan, 30 kilometres south of Amphoe Chanuman. The other two rivers in the province are the Lam Sae Bok and Lam Sae Bai.

National park
There is one national park, along with five other national parks, make up region 9 (Ubon Ratchathani) of Thailand's protected areas.
 Phu Sa Dok Bua National Park,

History
Amnat Charoen gained city status during the reign of King Rama III. It was first administered from Nakhon Khemarat, and later from Ubon Ratchathani. It became a province in its own right on 12 January 1993, when it was split off from Ubon Ratchathani. It is thus one of the four newest provinces of Thailand, together with Nong Bua Lam Phu and Sa Kaeo, both also established in 1993, and Bueng Kan, established in 2011.

Economy

The province is overwhelmingly agricultural. In 2008, Amnat Charoen locals developed the so-called "Dhamma agriculture" model based on self-governance and aimed at making the province a hub for organic farming. According to the Office of Agriculture Economics, Amnat Charoen in 2016 had a total of 883,499 rai planted in hom Mali rice. Sugarcane plantations increased from 40,688 rai in 2015 to 51,446 rai in 2016.

Symbols
In the middle of the provincial seal is an image of the Buddha called Phra Mongkol Ming Muang. Also known as Phra Yai (Big Buddha), this 20 m high statue is among the most sacred in the city of Amnat Charoen.

The provincial tree is Hopea ferrea.

The provincial slogan is Phra Mongkhon, seven river basins, sacred caves, Phra Lao, beautiful islands and mountain, precious silk and religious people.

Administrative divisions

Provincial government
The province is divided into seven districts (amphoe). The districts are further divided into 56 subdistricts (tambon) and 653 villages (muban).

Local government
As of 26 November 2019 there are: one Amnat Charoen Provincial Administration Organization and 24 municipal (thesaban) areas in the province. Amnat Charoen  has town (thesaban mueang) status. Further 23 subdistrict municipalities (thesaban tambon).The non-municipal areas are administered by 39 Subdistrict Administrative Organisations - SAO (ongkan borihan suan tambon).

Human achievement index 2017

Since 2003, United Nations Development Programme (UNDP) in Thailand has tracked progress on human development at sub-national level using the human achievement index (HAI), a composite index covering all the eight key areas of human development. National Economic and Social Development Board (NESDB) has taken over this task since 2017.

References

External links 
Official site of Phitsanulok province

See also
Khit cloth

External links

province page from the Tourist Authority of Thailand

Website of the province (Thai only)

 
Isan
Provinces of Thailand